Colin Mackenzie (1754–1821) was Surveyor General of India, art collector and orientalist.

Colin Mackenzie may also refer to:

Colin Mackenzie (Scottish writer) (1796–1854), writer, editor, translator and compiler
Colin Mackenzie (Indian Army officer) (1806–1881), British political officer in Afghanistan
Colin Mackenzie (British Army officer) (1861–1956), British soldier
William Colin Mackenzie (1877–1938), Australian fauna park founder
Colin Hercules Mackenzie (1898–1986), head of Force 136
Colin Mackenzie, 1st Earl of Seaforth (c. 1590–1633), Highland clan chief and Scottish nobleman
Colin Cam Mackenzie, 11th of Kintail (died 1594), Highland chief
Colin MacKenzie (poet), Australian poet and songwriter
Colin Mackenzie of Portmore (1770–1830), Scottish lawyer and companion of Sir Walter Scott
Colin Mackenzie (athlete) (born 1963), Welsh javelin thrower

See also
Colin McKenzie (disambiguation)